Travel Counsellors Ltd. is a travel agency headquartered in Manchester, England. When it was established in 1994, it was a pioneer of home-based travel selling. It has operations in the United Kingdom, Ireland, the Netherlands, Belgium, South Africa and the United Arab Emirates.

History
The company was established in 1994 by David Speakman and his wife Maureen.

In October 2014, Steve Byrne led a management buyout of the company, backed by Equistone Partners Europe.

In September 2015, the company announced plans to move its headquarters from Bolton to Manchester.

In June 2018, Vitruvian Partners financed an additional management buyout in which David Speakman and his wife Maureen sold their remaining interest in the company.

In February 2020, the company was ranked 89th on the UK's best 100 companies to work for by The Sunday Times.

In April 2020, the company established a fund to financially assist agents that were affected by the COVID-19 pandemic.

References

External links
 

1994 establishments in the United Kingdom
Manchester
Travel and holiday companies of the United Kingdom
Transport companies established in 1994